Sporthalle was an indoor arena located in Cologne, Germany. It was primarily used for basketball, other indoor sporting events and concerts until it closed due to the larger Lanxess Arena opening. The arena held 8,000 spectators and opened in 1958. It hosted the 1982 European Champions Cup final and was the regular home venue for BSC Saturn Köln basketball team.

External links
 Venue information

Defunct indoor arenas
Defunct basketball venues
Sports venues in Cologne
Defunct sports venues in Germany